"A Little Bit Off" is a song by American heavy metal band Five Finger Death Punch. It was their second single off of their eighth studio album F8. It topped the Billboard Mainstream Rock Songs chart in June 2020.

Background
The song was released as the second single from the band's eighth studio album, F8. A music video was released on June 8, 2020. The video is self-referential to the struggles they encountered to make the music video; their record label was urging them to record a music video for the song, which was already climbing up the rock music charts, but production issues kept occurring due to the COVID-19 pandemic. The video documents how support staff was limited and many things in production had to be cut. In the end, the video is relatively minimalist, featuring guitarist Zoltan Bathory and bassist Chris Kael dressed up as an angel and demon playing chess, and frontman Ivan Moody singing in a deserted downtown Las Vegas backdrop in the middle of the day.

In June 2020, the song topped the Billboard Mainstream Rock Songs, making it the band's ninth song to do so. In addition to being one of the bands with the most chart toppers for the long-running chart, the song was also one of the first to top Billboards newly created Hot Hard Rock Songs chart.

Themes and composition
"A Little Bit Off" is a rock song driven by an acoustic guitar riff. Lyrically, the song has been described as about frontman Ivan Moody's "laundry list of little anxieties" and his previous struggles related to mental health and alcohol addiction. Retroactively, band members would allude to the song's message as being relevant to people's emotions during the COVID-19 pandemic as well.

Reception
Loudwire named it one of the best rock songs of 2020, praising its emotional lyrics for being "open and honest" about mental health.

Personnel
 Ivan Moody – lead vocals 
 Zoltan Bathory – rhythm guitar
 Jason Hook – lead guitar, backing vocals
 Chris Kael – bass, backing vocals
 Charlie Engen – drums, percussion

Charts

Weekly charts

Year-end charts

Certifications

References

2019 songs
2020 singles
Five Finger Death Punch songs